Castro Fútbol Club is a Spanish football team based in Castro Urdiales, in the autonomous community of Cantabria. Founded in 1952, it plays in Tercera División RFEF – Group 3, holding home games at Estadio Riomar, which has a capacity of 1,000 spectators.

Season to season

39 seasons in Tercera División
1 season in Tercera División RFEF

External links
Official website 
Futbolme team profile 

Football clubs in Cantabria
Association football clubs established in 1952
1952 establishments in Spain